The bureaucratic administration of Japan is divided into three basic levels; national, prefectural, and municipal. They are defined by the Local Autonomy Law of 1947.

Below the national government there are 47 prefectures, six of which are further subdivided into subprefectures to better service large geographical areas or remote islands. 

The 1718 municipalities (792 cities, 743 towns, and 183 villages) and 23 special wards of Tokyo are the lowest level of government; the twenty most-populated cities outside Tokyo Metropolis are known as designated cities and are subdivided into wards.

Prefectural divisions 

The top tier of administrative divisions are the 47 prefectural entities: 43  proper, two , one , and one . Although different in name, they are functionally the same.

Ken
 are the most common types of prefectural divisions total of 43 ken. The kanji (character) from which this is derived means "county".

To
Tokyo Metropolis is referred to as a  after the dissolution of Tokyo City in 1943, Tōkyō-fu (Tokyo Prefecture) was upgraded into Tōkyō-to and the former Tokyo City's wards were upgraded into special wards. The kanji (character) from which this is derived means "capital".

Fu

The Chinese character from which this is derived implies a core urban zone of national importance in middle period of China, or implies a sub division of a province in late period of China.

Dō

This was also a historical usage of the character in China meaning circuit.

Subprefectural divisions
There are only two types of subprefectural divisions: subprefecture and district.

Subprefecture

 are a Japanese form of self-government which focuses on local issues below the prefectural level. It acts as part of the greater administration of the state and as part of a self-government system.

District

 were administrative units in use between 1878 and 1921 that were roughly equivalent to the counties of China or the United States. In the 1920s, municipal functions were transferred from district offices to the offices of the towns and villages within the district. District names remain in the postal address of towns and villages, and districts are sometimes used as boundaries for electoral districts, but otherwise serve no official function. The Classical Chinese character from which this is derived means commandery.

Municipal divisions

The municipal divisions are divided into three main categories city, town, and village. However the city entities are further categorized. The Special wards of Tokyo are also considered to be municipal divisions.

Cities
Cities in Japan are categorized into four different types, from the highest the designated city, the core city, the special city, and the regular city at the lowest.

Designated city

Designated cities are also subdivided into wards.

Core city

A  is a Japanese city that has a population greater than 300,000 and an area greater than 100 square kilometers, although special exceptions may be made by order of the cabinet for cities with populations under 300,000 but over 200,000. Core city was created by the first clause of Article 252, Section 22 of the Local Autonomy Law of Japan.

Special city

A  of Japan is a city with a population of at least 200,000. This category was established by the Local Autonomy Law, article 252 clause 26.

City

A  is a local administrative unit in Japan with a population of at least 50,000 of which at least 60% of households must be established in a central urban area, and at least 60% of households must be employed in commerce, industry or other urban occupations. Like other contemporary administrative units, they are defined by the Local Autonomy Law of 1947.

Town

A  is a local administrative unit in Japan.  It is a local public body along with prefecture (ken or other equivalents), city (shi), and village (mura).  Geographically, a town is contained within a prefecture.

Village

A  is a local administrative unit in Japan. Geographically, a village's extent is contained within a prefecture. It is larger than an actual settlement, being in actuality a subdivision of a rural , which are subdivided into towns and villages with no overlap and no uncovered area.

Special Ward

The  are 23 municipalities that together make up the core and the most populous part of Tokyo Metropolis, Japan. Together, they occupy the land that was originally the Tokyo City before it was abolished in 1943 to become part of the newly created Tokyo Metropolis. The special wards' structure was established under the Japanese Local Autonomy Law and is unique to Tokyo Metropolis.

Submunicipal divisions

Ward

A  is a subdivision of the cities of Japan that are large enough to have been designated by government ordinance.

History 
Although the details of local administration have changed dramatically over time, the basic outline of the current two-tiered system since the abolition of the han system by the Meiji government in 1871 are similar. Before the abolition of the han system, Japan was divided into  then subdivided into  and then  at the bottom.

Structural hierarchy

See also
 Decentralisation in Japan

References

External links 

 
Japan